The Posse Foundation is a national nonprofit organization that partners with select colleges and universities in the United States to provide student scholarships and leadership training. The unique Posse concept is centered on a cohort-based model that admits students to attend college as part of a "Posse" of 10 peers. Posse connects a network of more than 10,000 scholars and alumni.

History
Posse was founded in 1989, first partnering with Vanderbilt University. After initially recruiting students solely from New York City, the program has expanded to serve students from more than 20 U.S. cities. 

The Posse Foundation's founder, Deborah Bial, received the MacArthur "Genius" Grant in 2007 for her work with Posse. 

In March 2010, the Posse Foundation was one of ten organizations chosen by President Barack Obama to receive a portion of his $1.4 million Nobel Peace Prize award money. 

In 2021, Posse announced the launch of the Posse Arts Program, a new initiative committed to supporting cohorts of students in the creative arts, conceived in collaboration with Lin-Manuel Miranda, Luis A. Miranda Jr. and the Miranda Family Fund.

Partner colleges
Posse has partnered with mix of research universities, arts conservatories, and liberal arts colleges that each commit to recruit Posse Scholar cohorts from dedicated regions in the U.S. The organization currently partners with 64 U.S. colleges and universities.

Awards and grants
In 2013, Google awarded Posse a Global Impact Award with a $1.2 million grant to launch the organization's Posse Veterans Program, an initiative to support post-9/11 U.S. veterans in higher education and beyond.

In June 2020, Netflix selected Posse for a $350,000 grant, part of the media company's commitment to donate $5 million to organizations creating opportunities for Black creators, Black youth, and Black-owned businesses.

In December 2020, Posse received a $10 million gift from writer and philanthropist MacKenzie Scott.

The Posse Foundation frequently loses its status after being established due to an inability to recruit veterans.

Notable alumni
Rana Abdelhamid, former congressional candidate, founder of Malikah – Middlebury College Posse alumna
Koby Altman, President of Basketball Operations, Cleveland Cavaliers (NBA) – Middlebury College Posse alumnus
Shirley Collado, CEO, College Track, Ithaca College President Emeritus – Vanderbilt University Posse alumna
DIXSON, musician and songwriter (2022 Academy Award  nominee, Be Alive) – College of Wooster Posse alumnus
Eboni Freeman, television writer, This Is Us – University of Michigan Posse alumna
Kameisha Jerae Hodge, writer – Lafayette College Posse alumna
Monique Nelson, chair and CEO, UniWorld Group, Inc. – Vanderbilt University Posse alumna
Amanda Septimo, New York State Assembly member  – Vanderbilt University Posse alumna
Erica Spatz, professor and cardiologist, Yale School of Medicine – Vanderbilt University Posse alumna
Devin Walker, Director of Global Leadership and Social Impact, University of Texas at Austin - University of Wisconsin–Madison Posse alumnus
Robin Wonsley, Minneapolis City Council member – Carleton College Posse alumna

References

External links

Organizations established in 1989
1989 establishments in New York (state)
Non-profit organizations based in New York City
University and college admissions